Paul Gladstone Chandler (November 7, 1889 – August 8, 1986) was an American football, basketball and baseball coach, educator, and college president. He served as the head football coach (1920–1922), head men's basketball coach (1920–1923) and head baseball coach (1922) at Kent State Normal College—now known as Kent State University—in Kent, Ohio.

Chandler earned Master of Arts and Doctor of Philosophy degrees from Columbia University. He was the head of the education depart of Kent State for seven years and taught at Millersville State Teachers College—now known as Millersville University of Pennsylvania for ten years. He was as the president of Clarion State College—now known as PennWest Clarion—from 1937 to 1960.

Head coaching record

Football

References

External links
 

1889 births
1986 deaths
20th-century American educators
Heads of universities and colleges in the United States
Kent State Golden Flashes baseball coaches
Kent State Golden Flashes football coaches
Kent State Golden Flashes men's basketball coaches
Kentucky Wesleyan Panthers football players
Kent State University faculty
Millersville University of Pennsylvania faculty
Columbia University alumni
People from Princeton, Kentucky
Coaches of American football from Kentucky
Players of American football from Kentucky
Basketball coaches from Kentucky
Educators from Kentucky